Parliamentary elections were held in the Gilbert Islands on 1 February 1978, with a second round on 6 February.

Electoral system
The  recommendations of the 1977 constitutional convention on a proposed electoral system were introduced prior to the 1978 elections. There were to be 35 members of the House of Assembly, who would be elected from 13 single-member constituencies, 8 two-member constituencies, and 2 three-member constituencies. The three-member constituencies covered South Tarawa, the capital and home to nearly one-third of the entire population of 56,000. For the first time, Christmas, Fanning and Washington Islands, as well as Banaba, each returned one member from their populations of migrant workers and their families.

The 35 members of the House of Assembly were elected from 23 constituencies (with each island forming a constituency) using the two-round system; if no candidate received a majority of the vote in the first round, a second round was held within seven days.

Campaign
All candidates for the 35 seats ran as independents. In three constituencies (two seats on Beru, one on Arorae) the candidates were returned unopposed.

Results

Elected members

Aftermath
An election for Chief Minister was held on 17 March between Ieremia Tabai, Roniti Teiwaki, Babera Kirata and Taomati Iuta. After Tabai won with 56% of the vote, he appointed a cabinet with Teewe Arobati as Minister for the Line and Phoenix Group, Tiwau Awira as Minister for Finance, Iuta as Minister for Trade, Industry and Labour, Kirata as Minister for Works and Communications, Abete Merang as Minister Health and Community Affairs, Ieremia Tata as Minister for Education, Training and Culture, Teatao Teannaki as Minister for Home Affairs and Teiwaki as Minister for Natural Resource Development. Following independence, Tabai became president, with Teannaki as vice-president.

References

Gilbert Islands
1978 in the Gilbert Islands
Elections in Kiribati
Non-partisan elections